Klong khaek is a type of double-headed barrel drum used in Thai music. The term literally means "Indian drum" from the words klong (กลอง) meaning drum and Khaek (แขก) meaning Indian or Tamil. Looks the same as the Klong malayu; those are shorter and heavier.

There are two types of klong khaek: klong khaek tua phu which is considered to be male, and klong khaek tua mia regarded as female. They are always played in a pair, usually by two players, although if two players are not available a single player may play both drums. The two drums fit their beats together in hocket, or interlocking form.

Both drumheads are played with the hands, like the klong songna. The klong khaek tua phu has a higher pitch and the klong khaek tua mia has a lower pitch.

See also
Traditional Thai musical instruments
Klong song na

External links
Sound sample
Klong khaek page
Klong khaek page

Thai musical instruments
Hand drums